USS Shoshone (ID-1760) was a transport that served in the United States Navy in 1919. Shoshone (ID-1760), the first United States Navy ship of the name, was built in 1911 by Bremer Vulkan at Vegesack, Germany, and operated as a passenger-cargo ship by the Hamburg-America Line as SS Wasgenwald. Wasgenwald was chartered for World War I service by the United States Army on 26 October 1917 from the Custom House, New York, and used as a depot collier with the name SS Shoshone.

Description
The ship had a gross register tonnage (GRT) of 4,708. As built, the vessel could carry 50 first-class passengers. In United States military service, the vessel was armed with one /51 caliber gun and one /50 caliber gun.

Service history

Early service
The vessel was constructed in 1911 by Bremer Vulkan at their yard in Vegesack, Germany with the yard number 552. The vessel was launched on 30 December 1911 and named Wasgenwald. The merchant ship was completed in February 1912 and registered in Hamburg. Owned by the German Hamburg-Amerika Line at the onset of World War I, Wasgenwald took shelter at Saint Thomas in the Dutch Virgin Islands. The ship was interned by the United States after they took over the Virgin Islands in March 1917, where the vessel had remained since the outbreak of war. However, before the Virgin Islands could become an American colony, the vessel was purchased from her German owners by the Kerr Navigation Company, renamed Shoshone and registered in New York City.

American military service 
The Kerr Navigation Company then chartered the vessel to the United States Army. In October 1917, the vessel was inspected for possible requisition and given the identification number 1760, however was not taken up into immediate service by the United States Navy. The Dictionary of American Naval Fighting Ships believes that the ship was operated on behalf of the Army by the U.S. Shipping Board with a civilian crew until the end of the war. Silverstone states that the ship was used as an Army collier.

Following the end of the war, Shoshone was acquired by the United States Navy for use as a troop transport to return American soldiers from France. The ship was placed in commission as USS Shoshone on 18 February 1919. She was attached to the Cruiser and Transport Force and, between February and July 1919, made two voyages to St. Nazaire, France, returning to the United States with American troops coming home from World War I service in Europe. Shoshone was decommissioned at Norfolk, Virginia on 5 August 1919 and returned to her owner.

Merchant career
In 1920, the vessel was acquired by first the American Interlake Line before the Canada Steamship Lines purchased the vessel and renamed her Manoa and registered her in London. The ship entered service in 1921 and remained with the company until the vessel was sold to Boston Iron & Metal Co of Baltimore, Maryland. Boston Iron & Metal Co in turn sold her back to her original owners, the Hamburg-Amerika Line. The Hamburg-Amerika Line renamed the vessel Grunewald and the ship was registered in Hamburg. Grunewald remained in service until 1933, when the vessel was sold for scrap. The ship was broken up during the first quarter of 1933 at Hamburg by Deutsche Werft.

Citations

References

External links

Department of the Navy: Naval Historical Center Online Library of Selected Images: Civilian Ships: S.S. Shoshone (Freighter, 1911). Originally German Passenger-Cargo Steamer Wasgenwald. Served as USS Shoshone (ID # 1760) in 1919

Transports of the United States Navy
Ships built in Bremen (state)
Ships of the Hamburg America Line
1911 ships
Ships of the Compagnie Générale Transatlantique
Canada Steamship Lines